French Creek Township is a township in Mercer County, Pennsylvania, United States. The population was 710 at the 2020 census, a decrease from the figure of 771 in 2010.

History
The Bridge in French Creek Township was listed on the National Register of Historic Places in 1988.

Geography

Demographics
As of the census of 2000, there were 764 people, 280 households, and 211 families residing in the township.  The population density was 36.9 people per square mile (14.2/km2).  There were 309 housing units at an average density of 14.9/sq mi (5.8/km2).  The racial makeup of the township was 99.48% White, 0.13% Asian, 0.26% Pacific Islander, 0.13% from other races. Hispanic or Latino of any race were 0.79% of the population.

There were 280 households, out of which 35.7% had children under the age of 18 living with them, 66.8% were married couples living together, 6.4% had a female householder with no husband present, and 24.3% were non-families. 20.0% of all households were made up of individuals, and 7.5% had someone living alone who was 65 years of age or older.  The average household size was 2.57 and the average family size was 2.99.

In the township the population was spread out, with 24.9% under the age of 18, 5.5% from 18 to 24, 28.0% from 25 to 44, 25.8% from 45 to 64, and 15.8% who were 65 years of age or older.  The median age was 40 years. For every 100 females there were 99.5 males.  For every 100 females age 18 and over, there were 95.9 males.

The median income for a household in the township was $35,568, and the median income for a family was $43,333. Males had a median income of $31,786 versus $23,125 for females. The per capita income for the township was $16,064.  About 7.6% of families and 11.3% of the population were below the poverty line, including 14.5% of those under age 18 and 8.1% of those age 65 or over.

References

Townships in Mercer County, Pennsylvania